This is a list of alumni and faculty from the University of British Columbia.

Alumni

Nobel laureates

 Bertram Brockhouse, BA 1947 (math and physics), Nobel laureate (Physics, 1994) "for the development of neutron spectroscopy"
 Robert Mundell, BA 1953, Nobel laureate (Economics, 1999) "for his analysis of monetary and fiscal policy under different exchange rate regimes and his analysis of optimum currency areas"

Academia

Architecture
 Arthur Erickson, AIA Gold Medal-winning architect of buildings including the Museum of Anthropology at UBC
 Bing Thom, architect of various urban design projects around Canada and the United States

Business

 David Cheriton, Google founding investor and computer science professor at Stanford University
 Dominic Barton, Global managing director of McKinsey & Co.
 Andrew Bibby, BCom 1980, President, Grosvenor Americas
 Dean Bosacki, businessman
 Yael Cohen, non-profit executive and philanthropist; founder of Fuck Cancer
 Herb Dhaliwal, businessman, real estate developer and philanthropist
 Lalith Gamage, CEO of Sri Lanka Institute of Information Technology
 Martin Glynn, MBA 1972, President and CEO, HSBC Canada
 Lindsay Gordon, MBA 1976, CEO of HSBC Canada, Chancellor, University of British Columbia
 Darren Huston, former president and CEO of Priceline
 Frank Iacobucci, BCom 1961, former Puisne Justice, Supreme Court of Canada; former Dean, University of Toronto's Faculty of Law
 David Ing, marketing scientist and senior consultant
 Paul Lee, former President of Electronic Arts
 Brandt C. Louie, President and CEO of H.Y. Louie Co. Limited, and Chairman of London Drugs Limited
 Kyle MacDonald, blogger and founder of the One red paperclip website
 John H. McArthur, BCom 1957, Dean Emeritus, Harvard Business School
 Henry McKinnell, CEO and chairman of the board, Pfizer
 Nadir Mohamed, BCom 1978, CEO, Rogers Communications
 Sarah Morgan-Silvester BCom 1982, former Chancellor, University of British Columbia
 Jim Pattison, chief executive officer, Chairman and sole owner of the Jim Pattison Group, the second largest privately held company in Canada (did not graduate)
 Shahrzad Rafati, BSc Computer Science 2005, CEO, BroadbandTV Corp
 Ben Rutledge, BCom 2006, Canadian rower and '08 Olympic gold medalist
 Gregg Saretsky, MBA 1984, President & CEO, WestJet
 William Sauder, BCom 1948, Chairman of International Forest Products Ltd. and Sauder Industries; contributor to the Sauder School of Business; former Chancellor of UBC
Patrick Soon-Shiong, South African-American surgeon and chairman of NantHealth
 Peter Wall, property developer in Vancouver; played a significant and controversial part in the city's real-estate boom in the 1992-2000s; established the Peter Wall Institute for Advanced Studies (did not graduate)
 Nolan Watson, co-founder of Sandstorm Resources Ltd.; known for his contribution to finance innovation in the mining industry; youngest CFO (age 26) of a New York Stock Exchange listed company; helped develop the silver streaming business model; raise over $1 billion in debt and equity to fund Silver Wheaton's growth into the largest streaming company in the world
 Kevin Ma, entrepreneur, Publisher, founder of Hypebeast.com, 
 Brian Wong, internet entrepreneur; co-founded Kiip, a mobile app rewards platform; in 2010 surpassed Mark Zuckerberg to become youngest entrepreneur to raise venture capital funding
Jacki Zehner, BCom 1987, President of Women Moving Millions; youngest woman to be made a partner in Goldman Sachs, in 1996

Government, politics, and law

Journalism

Literature

Music
 Michael Conway Baker, composer
 Dan Mangan, musician
 Emily Haines, musician, Metric (band)
 Lance Ryan, tenor
 Alexander Gumuchian (bbno$), rapper
 Ben Heppner, tenor
 Hildegard Westerkamp, composer
 Anne Kang, BMus'99, Minister of Advanced Education and Skills Training of British Columbia
 Mark Takeshi McGregor, flutist

Entertainment

Science and engineering

Sports

Visual arts
 Amy Malbeuf, visual artist, educator, and cultural tattoo practitioner
 Kimberly Phillips, educator and curator

Rhodes Scholars
 Dominic Barton (1984)

Faculty (former and current)

Nobel laureates

Archaeology
Richard J. Pearson, archaeologist and gardener

Architecture
Arthur Erickson, architect

Business and economics
Brian Burke, former President and general manager of the Toronto Maple Leafs
Rogemar Mamon, mathematician

Chemistry 

 Laurel Schafer, Canada Research Chair in Catalyst Development, Full Professor (current)

English Department
 W. H. New, Professor of English Literature

First Nations and Indigenous Studies
 Daniel Heath Justice, professor and chair of the First Nations Studies Program
Glen Coulthard, Yellowknives Dene professor and political theorist

Geography
Shahul Hasbullah, professor and researcher

History
Timothy Brook, sinologist
George F.G. Stanley, historian; designer of Canadian flag; Lieutenant-Governor of New Brunswick

Journalism
 David Rummel, Senior Producer of The New York Times; winner of Pulitzer Prize and the George Foster Peabody Awards
 Steve Woodward, Pulitzer Prize-winning journalist

Law
 David Eby, Attorney-General of British Columbia, Director of the British Columbia Civil Liberties Association from 2008 to 2012

Linguistics
Robert John Gregg, linguist and specialist in Ulster Scots dialects and Canadian English
Dale Kinkade, linguist and specialist on Salishan languages
Edwin G. Pulleyblank, linguist and specialist in Old Chinese

Literature

Music
 Stephanie Nakagawa, vocal teacher, winner of the Voice Gold Medal from the Royal Conservatory of Music
 Carol Wong, pianist, senior examiner at the Royal Conservatory of Music, first pianist to receive the Laureate Award from the Music Academy of the West
 Jasper Wood, Chair, Strings Division Professor of Violin and Chamber Music
 Julia Nolan, saxophonist
 Fred Stride, Senior Sessional Lecturer, Jazz Theory and Arranging
 Jose Franch-Ballester, Assistant Professor, Clarinet and Chamber Music
 Jonathan Girard, director, Orchestral Activities, Associate Professor, Conducting and Ensembles
 Nancy Hermiston, Chair, Voice and Opera Divisions, Director, UBC Opera Ensemble, Officer of the Order of Canada for her achievements as an opera singer, stage director, and educator
 Graeme Langager, Director of Choral Activities
 Andrew Dawes, Professor Emeritus of Music (2005), Violin, three-time Juno winner, Appointed Member of the Order of Canada in 1991
 T. Patrick Carrabré, Director of the School of Music, professor, Composition, former associate composer for the Winnipeg Symphony Orchestra
 Krisztina Szabó, Assistant Professor, Voice and Opera
 Andrew Dawes, Professor Emeritus of Music (2005), Violin
 James Fankhauser, Professor Emeritus of Music (2000), Voice & Choral Conducting, Former Director, UBC University Singers

Political science
Catherine Dauvergne, holds the Canada Research Chair in Migration Law
Michael Ignatieff, academic, politician, and former Leader of the Opposition
Norman MacKenzie
Beverley McLachlin, Former Chief Justice of the Supreme Court of Canada; professor at the University of British Columbia (1974–1981)

Performing arts

Psychology
 Larry Cochran, professor of Counseling Psychology
 Kenneth D. Craig, psychologist
 Steven Taylor (psychologist), psychologist
 Catharine Winstanley, behavioural neuroscientist

Science and engineering

Sociology
Neil Guppy, former head of department 
Giselle O. Martin-Kniep, educator specializing in learning communities

Visual arts
Ken Lum, artist; represented Canada at the Sydney Biennale, the São Paulo Art Biennial, the Shanghai Biennale and at Documenta XI
 Art Spiegelman, comics artist and Pulitzer Prize winner
Jeff Wall, photographer; Tate Gallery Retrospective; MOMA; Hasselblad Award; key figure in the photoconceptualist Vancouver School

Invested into the Order of Canada
 Father David Bauer  (1967), Basilian priest, chaplain and ethics teacher at St. Mark's College (1961–1988)
 Basil Stuart-Stubbs,  (2006), University Librarian (1964–1981)
 W.H. New  (2007), Professor of English Literature (1965–2003)
 Jane Coop,  (2013), Professor of Music (1980–2012)
 Clyde Hertzman,  (2013), Professor of Population and Public Health (until 2013)
 Nassif Ghoussoub,  (2016), FRSC, Professor of Mathematics (1979–present)
 Bob Hindmarch,  (2019), Professor and director of physical education (1961–1992)

Recipients of honorary degrees

See also
List of chancellors of the University of British Columbia
List of presidents of the University of British Columbia

References

 
British Columbia, University of
University of British Columbia